The new Turkish lira was the currency of Turkey and  the de facto independent state of the Turkish Republic of Northern Cyprus between 1 January 2005 and 31 December 2008 which was a transition period for the removal of six zeroes from the currency. The new lira was subdivided into 100 new kuruş (yeni kuruş). The symbol was YTL and the ISO 4217 code was TRY.

History
Because of the chronic inflation experienced in Turkey from the 1970s through to the 1990s, the old lira experienced severe depreciation. Turkey has had high inflation rates compared to developed countries and suffered hyperinflation. From an average of 9 lira per U.S. dollar in the late 1960s, the currency came to trade at approximately 1.65 new lira per U.S. dollar in late 2001. This represented an average inflation of about 38% per year. Prime Minister Recep Tayyip Erdoğan had called this problem a "national shame". With the revaluation of the Turkish old lira, the Romanian leu (also revalued in July 2005) briefly became the world's least valued currency unit.

In late December 2003, the Grand National Assembly of Turkey passed a law that allowed for the removal of six zeroes from the currency, and the creation of the new lira. It was introduced on 1 January 2005, replacing the previous lira (which remained valid in circulation until the end of 2005) at a rate of 1 new lira = 1,000,000 old lira.

Following its introduction, the official name of the currency was the "New Turkish Lira", but according to the Central Bank, the word "new" (yeni) was only a "temporary" measure. A news agency reported that "new" would be removed on January 1, 2009. The same source also indicated that the banknotes would have "different shapes and sizes to prevent forgery". The issuance of a new highest denomination, 200 lira, was contemplated at the same time.

Coins
Coins were introduced in 2005 in denominations of 1, 5, 10, 25 and 50 new (Yeni) kuruş and 1 new (Yeni) lira. The 1 new (Yeni) kuruş was minted in brass and the 5, 10 and 25 new kuruş in cupro-nickel, whilst the 50 new kuruş and 1 new lira are bimetallic. All coins show portraits of Mustafa Kemal Atatürk.

To the dismay of the European Central Bank, the sizes and compositions of the 50 new kuruş and 1 new lira coins clearly resemble those of the €1 and €2 coins respectively. This could cause confusion in the eurozone. It also caused trouble to businesses using vending machines (particularly at airports) in the eurozone since a number of vending machines at the time accepted the 1 new lira coin as a €2 coin. Since €2 is worth roughly four times more, vending machines affected had to be upgraded at the expense of their owners.

Banknotes
Banknotes, referred to by the Central Bank as the "E-8 Emission Group", were introduced in 2005 in denominations of 1, 5, 10, 20, 50, and 100 new lira. Whilst the lower four denominations replaced older notes and used very similar designs, the 50 and 100 new lira notes did not have equivalents in the old currency. All notes show portraits of Mustafa Kemal Atatürk from different points of his life and images of various historical and otherwise important buildings and places in Turkey. A new series of banknotes, the "E-9 Emission Group", entered circulation on 1 January 2009, with the E-8 group ceasing to be valid after 31 December 2009 (although still redeemable at branches of the Central Bank until 31 December 2019). The E-9 banknotes refer to the currency as "lira" rather than "new lira", and include a 200 lira denomination.

See also
 Economy of Northern Cyprus

References

External links 
Images of the new banknotes and coins
Coins from Turkey with pictures
 Turkish new lira official changeover Campaign
 YTL information site
 Ottoman Empire coins
 Turkish Republic banknotes
 Turkish Republic coins and banknotes

Economy of Northern Cyprus
Currencies introduced in 2005
2005 in Turkey
Currencies of Turkey